Leslie "Les" Bohem (born 1951) is an American screenwriter, television writer, and former bassist. He is the son of screenwriter Endre Bohem.

Biography
Bohem played bass in the 1980s with the pop groups Sparks and Gleaming Spires.

Bohem's writing credits include the miniseries Taken and the films Dante's Peak, Twenty Bucks (with his father), Daylight, and The Alamo. He also wrote the storybook of the Steven Spielberg produced mini-series Nine Lives.

Bohem wrote parts of the science-fiction television series Extant, executive produced by Spielberg and created the series Shut Eye, airing on the streaming service Hulu. It was given a straight-to-series 10-episode order. All ten episodes became available on December 7, 2016. A second season was ordered on March 20, 2017 which was released on December 6, 2017.

Filmography

Film

Television

References

External links
Personal website

Living people
1951 births
20th-century American bass guitarists
20th-century American male musicians
American male screenwriters
American male bass guitarists
American rock bass guitarists
American television writers
American television producers
American male television writers
Sparks (band) members